Johann Kana (also Johan Kana; 22 March 1882 – 6 January 1934 Tallinn) was an Estonian politician. He was a member of I Riigikogu and a member of II Riigikogu starting 28 October 1925 where he replaced Juhan Kukk. 

He was born on 22 March 1882 in Vana-Vändra Parish, Kreis Pernau.

He died on 6 January 1934 in Tallinn.

References

1882 births
1934 deaths
People from Põhja-Pärnumaa Parish
People from Kreis Pernau
Estonian Labour Party politicians
Members of the Riigikogu, 1920–1923
Members of the Riigikogu, 1923–1926